Michael Ruether (born September 20, 1962) is a former National Football League offensive lineman from 1984 through 1995. He was drafted in the first round of the special 1984 Supplemental NFL Draft by the St. Louis Cardinals. He played for the Los Angeles Express of the USFL in 1982 and 1983 before entering the NFL with the Cardinals in 1984. Ruether also played two seasons for the Denver Broncos and four seasons with the Atlanta Falcons. He has an ex-wife Marjorie Severin Biasotto and two children – son Reece Austin Ruether and daughter Ramsey Severin Phillips and granddaughter Charley Severin Phillips. His parents are Bob and Connie Ruether.

References

1962 births
Living people
American football offensive linemen
Texas Longhorns football players
St. Louis Cardinals (football) players
Denver Broncos players
Atlanta Falcons players
Los Angeles Express players
Players of American football from Inglewood, California